Hallsville High School is a public secondary school in Hallsville, Missouri. It is operated by the Hallsville R-IV School District and serves a small part of northeast Boone County, Missouri. It borders the Centralia, Sturgeon and Columbia Public School Districts.

Hallsville High School was established in 1920 when the first building was erected on the land donated by Wesley and Bertie Wright and David B. Carpenter. After the building was occupied in 1920, they expanded to four years of credit were required to graduate. The first graduating class of Hallsville High School was in 1921.

References

External links
Official site
Athletics & activities site

Hallsville, Missouri
Public high schools in Missouri
High schools in Boone County, Missouri